Cementon may refer to a location in the United States:

 Cementon, New York, a census-designated place
 Cementon, Pennsylvania, a census-designated place